Caferli can refer to:

 Caferli, Erzincan
 Caferli, Kuşadası